Coimbatore Town Hall is a neoclassical municipal building in Coimbatore, India. The town hall was built in 1892 in honour of Queen Victoria. It was funded by the municipality and philanthropic citizens. The building has been used for municipal corporation meetings,  public meetings and protests and civic receptions.

Construction

Construction funding was raised from various sources. Social activist and journalist S. P. Narasimhalu Naidu donated Rs. 1,000 in 1887. He played in a key role in mobilising funds from the public. The municipal corporation contributed Rs. 3,000.

Construction was completed in 1892 at a cost of Rs. 10,000.

Architecture

The building is built in neo-classical style on half an acre. The building has a 6000 sq. ft area. The roof is constructed using red Mangalore tiles made of hard laterite clay. This roof style is typical of most British Raj buildings.  The tiled roof is supported by solid timber roof trusses.

The building, painted in white, has two floors. Its walls are made of stone and lime mortar.  Three sides of the building have corridors with low roofs. The corridors have borders with Tuscan style stumpy columns. The windows have grills with wooden paneled shutters.

The facade of entrance porch has three Gothic arches and is topped with a balcony. The sides of the porch have a large arch. The foyer leads to a large assembly hall which has an area of 3000 sq. ft. The mezzanine floor serves as an overlooking  visitors' gallery for meetings.

History

The hall years hosted numerous civic receptions for visiting dignitaries including Mahatma Gandhi and C. Rajagopalachari.

The District Central library was inaugurated at the Town Hall building in 1952. The library functioned on the mezzanine floor between 1952 and 1956 before it moved to another building in VOC park.

Over time the building became neglected and dilapidated. 

A government order was issued for the demolition of the building in 1992. A group of activists and INTACH came together to garner support for saving it. The campaign was eventually successful and the corporation agreed to renovate the building. The renovation was done the same year at an estimated cost of Rs 1,500,000.

The building is the seat of Coimbatore Municipal Corporation and hosts regular meetings of the Coimbatore Municipal Corporation.

See Also
Kolkata Town Hall
The Asiatic Society of Mumbai
Delhi Town Hall
Victoria Public Hall,Chennai

References

City and town halls in India
Buildings and structures in Coimbatore
Government buildings completed in 1892
British colonial architecture in India
Neoclassical architecture in India